Guy M. Sundt (February 18, 1898 – October 25, 1955) was an American athlete, coach, and college athletics administrator. He played football and basketball and ran track at the University of Wisconsin–Madison.

Biography
After graduating from Wisconsin in 1922, Sundt spent two years at Ripon College in Ripon, Wisconsin, where he served as athletic director and coached football, basketball, and track. He returned to Wisconsin in 1924 as freshman football and basketball coach and assistant track coach. From 1924 until 1948, Sundt coached the backfield on the varsity Wisconsin Badgers football team. From 1948 until 1950, he served as the head track coach for the Badgers before taking the job as athletic director at Wisconsin, a role he filled until his death in 1955.

Head coaching record

Football

References

1898 births
1955 deaths
American football fullbacks
Ripon Red Hawks football coaches
Ripon Red Hawks men's basketball coaches
Wisconsin Badgers athletic directors
Wisconsin Badgers football coaches
Wisconsin Badgers football players
Wisconsin Badgers men's basketball coaches
Wisconsin Badgers men's basketball players
College men's basketball head coaches in the United States
College men's track and field athletes in the United States
College track and field coaches in the United States
Sportspeople from Madison, Wisconsin
American men's basketball players
Basketball coaches from Wisconsin
Basketball players from Wisconsin